Rodney Hardee is a folk artist who resides in Lakeland, FL. He is a working-class, self-taught, religiously inspired southern artist. He has been painting folk art since 1972 and has quite a unique style of art. It is folky but has an elegant touch with fine-grained images, and is often religious bordering on slightly odd.

Career
Hardee, who started out painting farm scenes, has since moved onto cats and Adam & Eve pictures, as well as periodically throwing in other various religious figures. He is proudly included in the "20th Century American Folk, Self Taught, and Outsider Art" by Betty-Carol Sellen. One influence Rodney used to inspire him early on his beginning as an artist was that of Grandma Moses' works. However, after painting a couple of trees and buildings like hers, he eventually took off into his own style. Interestingideas.com writes about Hardee saying that "He developed an edginess in his work that spills into the literal, with figures and colors (mostly primary) sharply delineated, typically arranged in spaces that are strongly defined geometrically." Another unique part of his paintings, is that he dates and writes a comment next to the date reading as if he is writing a letter from home to update people on his progress with his paintings.

Florida painter Ruby C. Williams credits Hardee for helping her launch her folk art career. when he encouraged her to sell her paintings. And as far as career boosts go, Howard Finster was a major influence to Hardee's beginnings in art when he visited lakeland in the 80s. Hardee has a significant collection of Howard Finster's works all over his walls at his home. One major value of Hardee's folk art career to which he centers his goals around is his want to help other folk artists in his community. He figures that if there are other people that share this same interest as him, then they would appreciate the same things that make him successful and happy as well.

References

"The Outsider Art Pages: Florida folk artists." INTERESTING IDEAS: Outsider art, roadside art & signs, eccentric culture. N.p., n.d. Web. 25 December 2009. .

Year of birth missing (living people)
Living people
Folk artists
People from Lakeland, Florida
Painters from Florida
American male painters
20th-century American painters
21st-century American painters
21st-century American male artists
20th-century American male artists